Taiwanese singer Jolin Tsai has released 15 studio albums, seven live albums, and 11 compilation albums. After emerged champion at an MTV Mandarin-produced television singing competition show in 1998, she released her debut studio album, 1019 (1999), and it sold more than 450,000 copies in Taiwan. In the following year, she released her second studio album, Don't Stop, it sold more than 500,000 copies in Taiwan, and it became the year's sixth highest-selling album in the country. Her third studio album, Show Your Love, was released by the end of the same year, it sold more than 280,000 copies in Taiwan, and it became the eleventh highest-selling album of 2001 in the country. Her fourth studio album, Lucky Number (2001), sold more than 150,000 copies in Taiwan, and it became the year's nineteenth highest-selling album in the country.

In 2003, she released her fifth studio album, Magic, it sold more than 360,000 copies in Taiwan and total 1.5 million copies in Asia, and it became the year's highest-selling album by a female artist and the second highest-selling album overall in the country. Her sixth studio album, Castle, was released in 2004, it sold more than 300,000 copies in Taiwan and total 1.5 million copies in Asia, and it became the year's highest-selling album by a female artist and the second highest-selling album overall in the country. Her seventh studio album, J-Game (2005), sold more than 260,000 copies in Taiwan and total 1.2 million copies in Asia, and it became the year's highest-selling album by a female artist and the second highest-selling album in the country.

In 2006, she released her eighth studio album, Dancing Diva, it sold more than 300,000 copies in Taiwan and total 2.5 million copies in Asia, and it became the year's highest-selling album in the country. In 2007, she released the ninth studio album, Agent J, it sold more than 200,000 copies in Taiwan and total 3 million copies in Asia, and it became the year's highest-selling album in the country. In 2008, she released her cover album, Love Exercise, it sold more than 30,000 copies in Taiwan, and it became the highest-selling Western-language album in the country. Her tenth studio album, Butterfly, was released in 2009, it sold more than 210,000 copies in Taiwan and total 1 million copies in Asia, and it became the year's highest-selling album in the country.

In 2010, she released the eleventh studio album, Myself, it sold more than 65,000 copies in Taiwan, and it became the year's highest-selling album by a female artist and the fourth highest-selling album overall in the country. Her twelfth studio album, Muse, was released in 2012, it sold more than 100,000 copies in Taiwan, and it became the year's highest-selling album by a female artist and the third highest-selling album overall in the country. In 2014, she released the thirteenth studio album, Play, it sold more than 85,000 copies in Taiwan, and it became the year's highest-selling album by a female artist and the third highest-selling album overall in the country. In 2018, she released her fourteenth studio album, Ugly Beauty, and it became 2019's highest-selling album in Taiwan.

With sales of over 25 million records, Tsai is the highest-selling Taiwanese female recording artist since 2000. Since Magic (2003), each of her studio albums has been the highest-selling album by a female artist in Taiwan in its year of release, and four of the albums—Dancing Diva (2006), Agent J (2007), Butterfly (2009), and Ugly Beauty (2018)—were also the respective year's highest-selling album overall in the country.

Albums

Studio albums

Live albums

Compilation albums

See also 
 List of best-selling albums in Taiwan

References

External links 
 
 

Discographies of Taiwanese artists

Pop music discographies